Susan Devlin Peard (born 1931) is a former badminton player who represented both the US and Ireland in international competition. She is the daughter of J. Frank Devlin, an Irish badminton great, who moved his family to the United States in the late 1930s. She is the older sister of Judy Devlin Hashman, with whom she won numerous international women's doubles championships, including six titles at the prestigious All-England Championships (1954, 1956, 1960, 1961, 1963, 1966).

Career 
The Devlin sisters won a record ten United States women's doubles titles between 1953 and 1966. They also formed a doubles pairing that won all of its individual matches for the world champion U.S. Uber Cup (women's international) teams of 1957 and 1960.   In 1960 Susan Devlin married Irish badminton player Frank Peard and thereafter resided in Ireland. She won two Irish national women's doubles titles and played Uber Cup for Ireland in the '62-'63 and '65-'66 campaigns. In 1976 she was inducted into the U.S. Badminton Hall of Fame, now known as the Walk of Fame. In 2009, both Susan and Judy were inducted into the Goucher College athletics Hall of Fame.

References

External links
 Goucher College Athletics Hall of Fame

American female badminton players
Irish female badminton players
1931 births
Living people
Goucher College alumni
21st-century American women